Georges Bridgland (26 February 1915 - July 1997) was a French, triple British Classic-winning jockey, and St Leger and Arc de Triomphe winning trainer.

He was born Georges Albert Richard Bridgland to British parents in France on 26 February 1915.

His riding career lasted from 1928 to 1948. Pre-war, he was a leading jockey in his native France, becoming runner-up in the French Jockeys' Championship in 1936. Then, due to the Second World War, he relocated to England, where he won three Classics. The first two were wartime races - the 1941 St Leger on Sun Castle, the 1944 Oaks on Hycilla. The third was the 1947 Derby, the first to be held on a Saturday, which he won on unfancied outsider Pearl Diver, beating the odds-on favourite Tudor Minstrel and denying champion jockey Gordon Richards what would have been his first Derby win.

Shortly afterwards, he began training and was similarly successful. He won the 1956 St Leger with Cambremer, the 1957 King George VI and Queen Elizabeth Stakes with Montaval and the Prix de l'Arc de Triomphe with Prince Royal in 1964.

He died in July 1997 aged 82.

Major wins (as a jockey)
 Great Britain
 Derby Stakes - Pearl Diver (1947)
 Oaks Stakes - Hycilla (1944)
 St Leger Stakes - Sun Castle (1941)

Major wins (as a trainer)
 France
 Prix de l'Arc de Triomphe - Prince Royal (1964)

 Great Britain
 St Leger Stakes - Cambremer (1956)
 King George VI and Queen Elizabeth Stakes - Montaval (1957)

See also
List of jockeys

References

External links
 1947 Derby from Pathe News

1915 births

1997 deaths
French jockeys
French horse trainers